The 2006–07 season was Levski Sofia's 85th season in the First League. This article shows player statistics and all matches (official and friendly) that the club has played during the 2006–07 season.

First-team squad
Squad at end of season

Left club during season

Competitions

Supercup

A Group

Table

Results summary

Results by round

Fixtures and results

Bulgarian Cup

Levski advanced to Round 3.

Levski advanced to Quarterfinals.

Levski advanced Semifinals.

Levski advanced to Final.

Champions League

Second qualifying round

Third qualifying round

Group stage

References

External links 
 2006–07 Levski Sofia season

PFC Levski Sofia seasons
Levski Sofia
Bulgarian football championship-winning seasons